Al-Maghribī (meaning "from Maghreb") can refer to the following persons:

, mathematician and astronomer of the 12th century.
 (1220-1283), an Arab astronomer
Mahmud Sulayman al-Maghribi, former prime minister of Libya
Yusuf al-Maghribi, a 17th-century lexicographer active in Cairo. 
Ibn Said al-Maghribi, a famous geographer, historian and the most important collector of poetry from al-Andalus in the 12th and 13th centuries.

Surnames of Moroccan origin
Maghribi
Ethnonymic surnames